Antônio dos Santos Nascimento (19 May 1938 – 13 July 2018), commonly known as Tonho, was a Brazilian soccer player who played in the NASL.

Death
Tonho died in July 2018, following an infection after surgery on his knee.

Career statistics

Club

References

1938 births
2018 deaths
Brazilian footballers
Brazilian expatriate footballers
Association football goalkeepers
Cruzeiro Esporte Clube players
Washington Whips players
Associação Esportiva Velo Clube Rioclarense players
Rio Claro Futebol Clube players
Botafogo Futebol Clube (SP) players
Associação Atlética Caldense players
North American Soccer League (1968–1984) players
Associação Esportiva Velo Clube Rioclarense managers
Rio Claro Futebol Clube managers
Expatriate soccer players in the United States
Brazilian expatriate sportspeople in the United States